Tanner Laczynski (born June 1, 1997) is an American professional ice hockey center currently playing for the  Philadelphia Flyers of the National Hockey League (NHL).

Early life 
Laczynski was born in Shorewood, Illinois, and began playing minor hockey with the Chicago Mission.

Playing career

Amateur 
During his first year of junior hockey in 2013–14, Laczynski was cut by the Chicago Steel of the United States Hockey League (USHL). He returned to the team the next season for an impressive year, recording 18 goals and 28 assists with the Steel.

College 
In his career with Ohio State University, Laczynski recorded 143 points (48 goals and 95 assists) in 138 games.

Professional 
Laczynski made his NHL debut against the New York Islanders on April 3, 2021. After skating with the team for five games, Laczynski suffered a torn acetabular labrum in his right hip. He received surgery for the injury on April 26, with an expected recovery time of 16 weeks. After only two days of attending the Flyers' 2021 training camp, head coach Alain Vigneault announced that Laczynski required another surgery on the opposite hip, and that he would likely miss the entirety of the 2021–22 NHL season. He ultimately appeared in 28 games for the Phantoms during the 2021–22 season, recording seven goals and 17 points in the process. He also appeared in one game with the Flyers. On July 26, 2022, the Flyers signed Laczynski to a two-year, $1.525 million contract extension.

Career statistics

Regular season and playoffs

International

References

External links 
 

1997 births
Living people
American men's ice hockey centers
Chicago Steel players
Ice hockey players from Illinois
People from Shorewood, Illinois
Lehigh Valley Phantoms players
Lincoln Stars players
Ohio State Buckeyes men's ice hockey players
Philadelphia Flyers draft picks
Philadelphia Flyers players
AHCA Division I men's ice hockey All-Americans